Jirapa Municipal District is one of the eleven districts in Upper West Region, Ghana. Originally it was formerly part of the then-larger Jirapa/Lambussie District in 1988; until the northern part of the district was later split off to create Lambussie-Karni District on 29 February 2008; thus the remaining part has been renamed as Jirapa District, which it was later elevated to municipal district assembly status on 15 March 2018 to become Jirapa Municipal District. The municipality is located in the northwest part of Upper West Region and has Jirapa as its capital town.

Geography
The district shares boundaries to the South with Nadowli District, to the East with Sissala District, to the West with Lawra District and to the North with Lambussie-Karni District.

Sources
 
 GhanaDistricts.com

References

Districts of Upper West Region

Upper West Region